Tasman Ridge is a ridge, 3 nautical miles (6 km) long, located 10 nautical miles (18 km) northeast of Mount Hooker, bounded on the northwest by Ball Glacier and on the southeast by Hooker Glacier, descending into Blue Glacier in the Royal Society Range, Victoria Land. Named by New Zealand Geographic Board (NZGB) in 1994 in association with other names from Mount Cook National Park that are found in this area.

Ridges of Victoria Land
Scott Coast